Phek (pron:/ˈfɛk/) is a town located in the south-eastern part of the Indian state of Nagaland. It is the administrative seat of Phek District.

Demographics
 the 2011 census Phek town had a population of 14,204, of which 44% were female, and of which the literacy rate was 98%. 1.8% were children aged 6 or less. Since the 2001 census the population of 12,863 had increased by 10%.

Christianity is the religion of 98% of the inhabitants. Other religions followed are Hinduism by 1.3% of the population, Islam by 0.2%, Buddhism by 0.5%.

Education

Colleges
 Phek Government College

Schools
 Christian Mission Higher Secondary School
 Holy Care School
 Phek Government Higher Secondary School
 Royal Foundation School
 Bishop Abraham memorial High school

References

External links

 
Cities and towns in Phek district
Phek district